is a town located in Ayauta District, Kagawa Prefecture, Japan. , the town had an estimated population of 23,427 in 10108 households and a population density of 960 persons per km2.

Geography
Ayagawa is located almost in the center of Kagawa Prefecture, and is bordered by the Sanuki Mountains to the south.

Neighbouring municipalities 
Kagawa Prefecture
Takamatsu
Marugame
Sakaide
Mannō

Climate
Ayagawa has a humid subtropical climate (Köppen climate classification Cfa) with hot, humid summers, and cool winters. Some rain falls throughout the year, but the months from May to September have the heaviest rain.

Demographics
Per Japanese census data, the population of Ayagawa in 2020 is 22,693 people. Ayagawa has been conducting censuses since 1920.

History
The area of Ayagawa was part of ancient Sanuki Province. There're over 60 kofun burial mounds and numerous pottery kiln sites from the Kofun and Nara periods within the town borders. During the Edo Period,the town area was part of the holdings of Takamatsu Domain. With the creation of the modern municipalities system on February 15, 1890, the area was divided into villages within Ayauta District, Kagawa. The village of Ayakami (綾上村) was created from the merger of four villages in 1954 and raised to town status in 1962. The town of Ryōnan (綾南町) was likewise founded in 1954 from the merger of four villages. The town of Ayagawa was founded on March 21, 2006, from the merger of the towns of Ayakami and Ryōnan.

Government
Ayagawa has a mayor-council form of government with a directly elected mayor and a unicameral town council of 16 members. Ayagawa contributes one member to the Kagawa Prefectural Assembly. In terms of national politics, the town is part of Kagawa 2nd district  of the lower house of the Diet of Japan.

Economy
The local economy is heavily centered on agriculture. The town also claims to be the "birthplace of Sanuki udon" noodles, which were taught to a local by the famed Buddhist priest Kūkai, who brought the dish to Japan from Tang China to his parents in his hometown of Takinomiya, which is now within the town limits.

Education
Ayagawa has five public elementary schools and one public middle school operated by the town government, and one public high school operated by the Kagawa Prefectural Board of Education. There is also one private high school.

Transportation

Railways 
 Takamatsu-Kotohira Electric Railroad - Kotoden Kotohira Line
  -  -  -  -  -

Highways

Local attractions
Takinomiya Tenman-gū, noted Shinto shrine

References

External links

Official website 

Towns in Kagawa Prefecture
Ayagawa, Kagawa